Ali Fehmi Džabić (1853 – 5 August 1918) was a mufti of Mostar, Bosnia and Herzegovina.

Džabić was a figure in the Fata Omanović case of 1899. He remained in Constantinople until his death in 1918.

References

Bosnian Muslims from the Ottoman Empire
1853 births
1918 deaths
Bosnia and Herzegovina Muslims
Bosniaks of Bosnia and Herzegovina
People from Mostar